Omo River may refer to:
Omo River, in Ethiopia
Omo River (Yamanashi), in Japan
Omo River (Quebec), in Canada